Big Brother Brasil 9 was the ninth season of Big Brother Brasil which premiered January 13, 2009 with the season finale airing April 7, 2009 on the Rede Globo television network.

The show is produced by Endemol Globo and presented by Pedro Bial. That season was officially confirmed since 2008 as part of a millionaire contract between international Endemol and Rede Globo.

The grand prize was R$1 million with tax allowances, with a R$100,000 prize offered to the runner up and a R$50,000 prize offered to the 3rd place.

At the end, Maximiliano Porto from Maricá, RJ, won the competition over journalist Priscila Pires with 34.85% of the final vote (0.24% lead), in the closest vote in the history of the Big Brother series.

General
There were twenty housemates (the largest number of contestants to date) competing for the grand prize, an increase over the previous season. The season lasted 85 days (one of the longest seasons of the show, tied with the fourth and seventh seasons), an increase of one week over the previous season.

The season introduced the notion of "The Battle," in which the house is separated into a luxurious half (A) and a poor half (B), with two teams of housemates constantly fighting for time in the luxurious half. The wall that divided the house was effective only in the first week.
For the first time since the sixth season, the Finale Night featured a Final Three rather than a Final Two.

During the Show
At the launch night, there were eighteen housemates, but only fourteen entered the house. The remaining four contestants were locked for a week in a glass room located at a shopping mall in Rio de Janeiro.

At the end of the first week, viewers could vote one (later two) of the glass house housemates to enter the house. Emanuel (41% to save) and Josiane (37% to save) were chosen. Both entered in the house on day 9 (January 21, 2009).

On day 31 (February 12, 2009), two new housemates (Maíra Cardi and André) entered the house. They lived in a glass house (this time, located at the garden) for 4 days. Viewers could vote "yes" or "no" for both stay in the house. They chose "yes" with 59%.

This is the second time Big Brother Brasil has allowed a contestant of another Big Brother to stay in the house (He was Ricardo "Ricco" Venancio, the winner of Big Brother Africa 3). Ricco entered on day 47 (February 28, 2009) and stayed in the house for 4 days. He left the house on day 50 (March 3, 2009).

Ana Carolina Madeira (one of the most popular contestant of the season) was the housemate with the most number of nominations for eviction in Big Brother Brasil history, being seven times on the chopping block.

White Room Controversy
The "White Room" was the subject of controversy in the media, viewed as a cruel tactic of psychological torture. This kind of sensory deprivation is also used in CIA interrogations, which only increased the criticism of the block.

Housemates
(ages stated at time of contest)

Voting History
The voting table below records whom each housemate voted to nominate on the diary room during his or her time in the House. The Head of Household vote (cast in front of the other housemates) automatically nominate one housemate from eviction. Then, the other housemates voting and if the vote is tied, the HOH breaks the tie (all this types of vote count for the total number of nominations received).

Legend

Notes

 Leonardo answered the Hot Phone and was informed that he should get a blackboard in the pantry and write in it the names of three participants, in block letters. Among these three, one should be nominated (Naiá), another should be immunized (Francine) and the third (Ana Carolina) would be neutral.

 Newton answered the Hot Phone and was informed that he should choose two participants (Leonardo and Ralf) to receive a punishment together with him. After the food competition on Sunday, they should wear a white outfit until vote time, when the punishment (confinement in the White Room) was revealed, which ended with Leonardo walking away from the program and the elimination of the one nominated by the trio (Alexandre).

 Emanuel answered the Hot Phone and was informed that by accepting not to participate in the next HoH competition, he would win immunity. Emanuel accepted the proposal, therefore becoming immune, but not eligible to compete for the next leadership. As the Hot Phone indicated nobody, on Sunday Live Nominations, before the indication of the leader Priscilla, balls were drawn to define a third indication (whoever drew a red ball would automatically be nominated). Mirla was the second to draw and got the red ball, becoming nominated together with Ana and Newton.

 Maximiliano answered the Hot Phone and was automatically up for eviction. However, there would be a way for him to escape: he should enter the confessional and choose one person to go in his place. If the chosen (Emanuel) received three (or more) votes on Sunday Live Nominations, he would become nominated instead of Maximiliano. Maximiliano would have to convince the housemates to vote in that person, but without giving any clues that it was an exchange. On Sunday, Emanuel received 5 votes and went to the wall in place of Max. As Emanuel exchanged places with Max, the second most voted (Emanuel was the most voted) in the house, Ana, joined Mirla and Emanuel in nomination.

 Mirla answered the first call of Hot Phone and indicated Ralf, along with her, watching the parade of Carnival in Salvador. On the second call, Andre answered the Hot Phone and had to choose a Housemate to be automatically up for eviction. He chose to nominate Naiá.

 Milena answered the Hot Phone and was informed that should their votes to choose the next two nominations. For this, she should go to the pantry, pick up two red collars, put on your options (Mirla and ) and keep the secret in danger of going to be automatically up for eviction.

 Francine answered the Hot Phone and had to choose a Housemate to be automatically up for eviction or give immunity to someone. Francine decided to give immunity to Milena.

 Francine answered the first call of Hot Phone and was forbidden answered it again for the next 24 hours. In the second call, Priscilla answered the Hot Phone and was informed that should veto three participants to receive the power of immunity. For this, she should go to the pantry, pick up three yellow collars, put on your options (Josiane and ) and keep this a secret. Inside the Josiane's collar there was a note which informed that she was immunized.

 Priscila answered the Hot Phone and was informed that should to vote in two people this week. For the first vote, she should go to the pantry, pick up a white collar, put on your option (Naiá) and keep this a secret. Her second vote should to be on Sunday Live Nominations.

 Milena answered the Hot Phone and was informed that she could give immunity someone who were of her same group on the next Food Competition (if her group won only). But, if the other group won, she would have to give immunity someone of there. She also had to keep this a secret.

References

External links
 Big Brother Brasil 9
 Terra: BBB9

2009 Brazilian television seasons
09